Swallow Bluff Island is a river island on the Tennessee River in the U.S. state of Tennessee. The island was named for the swallows which congregated there.

Swallow Bluff Island contains the ancient Swallow Bluff Island Mounds.  The state of Tennessee sued a developer who in 1999 razed parts of the island for new homes construction, damaging the mound in the process.

References

Geography of Hardin County, Tennessee
River islands of Tennessee